José Júlio de Carvalho Peyroteo Martins Couceiro (born 4 October 1962) is a Portuguese football manager, currently the national technical director of the Portuguese Football Federation.

Managerial career
As a manager, Couceiro's career is marked with the relegation of Alverca in the 2003–04 season. He bounced back with a good run with Vitória de Setúbal, and won the best Portuguese coach prize. He then signed for Porto on 1 February 2005, going on to Belenenses during the 2005–06 season. In August 2006, he was appointed manager of the Portugal under-21 national team, reaching positive results in the UEFA Championships.

In July 2008, Couceiro was then appointed the head coach of FBK Kaunas, the Lithuanian A Lyga club controlled by Vladimir Romanov. On 5 August 2008, FBK Kaunas, playing in a UEFA Champions League play-off match, defeated 2007–08 UEFA Cup finalists Rangers 2–1 on aggregate to qualify for the third round for the first time in club history. He was then named head coach of the Lithuania national team on 14 August 2008. In his first competitive match as manager, Lithuania defeated Romania 3–0 in Cluj-Napoca for a 2010 FIFA World Cup qualifier. After that, they defeated Austria 2–0 at home, and the Faroe Islands 1–0. However, they did not qualify for the World Cup tournament proper, held in South Africa.

In April 2009, Couceiro signed as a manager with Turkish side Gaziantepspor.

On 26 February 2011, following the dismissal of Paulo Sérgio, Couceiro was named caretaker manager of Sporting CP for the remainder of the 2010–11 season. He then moved to Lokomotiv Moscow in July 2011, however left the club in May 2012 after his contract was not renewed.

After being appointed as manager of Vitória de Setubal in 2013, he was sacked on 15 May 2014. He then managed Estoril, leaving in March 2015. In May 2016, Couceiro was appointed manager of Vitória de Setubal for a third time. He left the role in May 2018.

In July 2018, he was appointed national technical director of the Portuguese Football Federation.

References

1962 births
Living people
Association football defenders
Portuguese footballers
Portuguese football managers
C.F. Os Belenenses
C.F. Estrela da Amadora players
Vitória F.C. managers
FC Porto managers
Sporting CP managers
Portuguese sportspeople of Angolan descent
Expatriate football managers in Lithuania
Lithuania national football team managers
FC Lokomotiv Moscow managers
Russian Premier League managers
Expatriate football managers in Russia
Portuguese expatriate sportspeople in Russia
Portuguese expatriate sportspeople in Turkey
Sportspeople from Lisbon
Süper Lig managers
Expatriate football managers in Turkey
Portuguese expatriate football managers